Bowater House was a 17-floor office block at 68 Knightsbridge in London SW1, completed in 1958.  The building occupied a site between Knightsbridge and South Carriage Road, at the southern edge of Hyde Park.  It was demolished in 2006 and redeveloped by Candy & Candy to create One Hyde Park.

Construction
A redevelopment of the site had been proposed in the 1930s.  The existing buildings were damaged by bombing during the Second World War and mostly demolished in 1942.  The cleared site was ripe for redevelopment after the war, and was acquired by the Land Securities Investment Trust.

A new building was designed by architects Guy Morgan & Partners as part of a wider but ultimately unrealised plan to create a large rectangular roundabout to the south, similar to Parliament Square, which would have included a sunken pedestrian piazza surrounded by commercial buildings and office blocks.   As the request of London County Council, the project included a widening of Knightsbridge, and the creation of a new dual-carriageway road beneath the building, named Edinburgh Gate after the Duke of Edinburgh, to provide access to Hyde Park, and also providing access to underground car parks.

The tower was lower than the skyscraper included in the original design, shortened during the planning process to reduce its visual impact when viewed from Hyde Park.

After clearing the site in 1956, construction started in 1957 and was completed in 1958. It was pre-let as the London headquarters of the Bowater Paper Corporation.

Harold Samuel, founder and chairman of Land Securities, commissioned a sculpture from Jacob Epstein: his last sculpture Rush of Green (also known as The Bowater House Group, The Return of Spring, The Family, or The Pan Group) was completed shortly before his death in 1959 and installed in 1961 on a plinth separating the carriageways beneath the building.  A maquette of the sculpture was exhibited in the foyer of the building.

Reception
Some critics considered the building to be a good example of modernist architecture, but others thought it ugly, blocky, and too heavy for its location beside the junction of Knightsbridge and Sloane Street.  An anecdote reports Ludwig Mies van der Rohe passing the building in 1959 in a taxi with Ernő Goldfinger: Goldfinger gestured towards the building, saying "This is all your fault"; Van der Rohe replied "I was not the architect of that building".

References

External links
 postwarbuildings.com
 skyscrapernews.com

Knightsbridge
Buildings and structures completed in 1958
Former buildings and structures in the City of Westminster
Office buildings in London
2006 disestablishments in England
Demolished buildings and structures in London
Buildings and structures demolished in 2006